KTMC-FM (105.1 FM) is a radio station broadcasting a Classic Rock music format. Licensed to McAlester, Oklahoma, United States. The station is currently owned by Southeastern Oklahoma Radio, LLC.

References

External links
McAlester Radio website

TMC-FM
Classic rock radio stations in the United States
Radio stations established in 1987